Dawson Creek (Flying L Ranch) Airport  is located  northwest of Dawson Creek, British Columbia, Canada.

See also
Dawson Creek Airport
Dawson Creek Water Aerodrome

References

Registered aerodromes in British Columbia
Dawson Creek